Abū al-ʿĀṣ ibn Umayya was a son of the eponymous progenitor of the Umayyad clan, Umayya ibn Abd Shams.

His sons were the following:

Affan, father of Caliph Uthman.
Al-Hakam, the father of the Umayyad caliph Marwan I.
Al-Mughira, maternal great-grandfather of the Umayyad caliph Abd al-Malik ibn Marwan.

He also had daughters:
Safiyya, who married Abu Sufyan. Their daughter Ramla was a wife of Muhammad.
Arwa, who married Amr ibn Hisham. Their daughter Asma was the second wife of Caliph Uthman.

Family tree

References

External links
islaam.net

6th-century Arabs
Banu Umayya